The Riddle of the Sands: A Record of Secret Service is a 1903 novel by Erskine Childers. The book, which enjoyed immense popularity in the years before World War I, is an early example of the espionage novel and was extremely influential in the genre of spy fiction. It has been made into feature-length films for both cinema and television.

The novel "owes a lot to the wonderful adventure novels of writers like Rider Haggard, that were a staple of Victorian Britain". It was a spy novel that "established a formula that included a mass of verifiable detail, which gave authenticity to the story – the same ploy that would be used so well by John Buchan, Ian Fleming, John le Carré and many others." All of the physical background is completely authentic – the various Frisian islands and towns named in the book actually exist and the descriptions of them accurate (often, from the author's own experience). The same is true for the various "sands" of the title – vast areas which are flooded at high tide but become mudflats at ebb. Navigating a small boat under these conditions requires a specialized kind of skilled seamanship, of which the character Davies is an unsurpassed master, and the descriptions of his feats are of abiding interest to yachting enthusiasts, quite apart from their role in the book's espionage plot.

Plot summary
Carruthers, a minor official in the Foreign Office, is contacted by an acquaintance, Davies, asking him to join in a yachting holiday in the Baltic Sea. Carruthers agrees, as his other plans for a holiday have fallen through, and because of a heartbreak due to a woman he courted becoming engaged to another man.

He arrives to find that Davies has a small sailing boat (the vessel is named Dulcibella, a reference to Childers's own sister of that name), not the comfortable crewed yacht that he expected. However, Carruthers agrees to go on the trip and joins Davies in Flensburg on the Baltic, whence they head for the Frisian Islands, off the coast of Germany. Carruthers has to learn quickly how to sail the small boat.

Davies gradually reveals that he suspects that the Germans are undertaking something sinister in the German Frisian islands. This is based on his belief that he was nearly wrecked by a German yacht luring him into a shoal in rough weather during a previous trip. The yacht was owned and captained by a mysterious German entrepreneur called Dollmann, whom Davies suspects of being in fact an expatriate Englishman posing as a German. The situation was further complicated by Davies having fallen deeply in love with Dollmann's daughter, Clara – who, Davies is sure, is not involved in whatever nefarious scheme her father is engaged upon. In any case, Davies is suspicious about what would motivate Dollmann to try to kill him, and believed that it is some scheme involving the German Imperial government. Having failed to interest anyone in the British government in the incident, Davies feels it is his patriotic duty to investigate further on his own – hence the invitation to Carruthers.

Carruthers and Davies spend some time exploring the shallow tidal waters of the Frisian Islands, moving closer to the mysterious site where there is a rumoured secret treasure recovery project in progress on the island of Memmert. The two men discover that Dollmann is involved in the recovery project. Carruthers and Davies try to approach Memmert. They are warned away by a German Navy patrol boat, the Blitz, and its commander von Brüning – who is friendly and affable, but still makes a veiled warning. This makes them all the more sure that there is something more than a treasure dig on the island. And meanwhile, they discover that not only is Dollmann indeed an Englishman, he had been an officer in the Royal Navy – evidently having had to leave Britain in hurry and take up a new life as a German.

Taking advantage of a thick fog, Davies navigates them covertly through the complicated sandbanks in a small boat to investigate the Memmert site. Carruthers investigates the island. He overhears von Brüning and Dollmann discussing something more than treasure hunting, including cryptic references to "Chatham", "Seven" and "the tide serving", and hears of a rendezvous at the Frisian railway station, several days ahead. The pair return through the fog to the Dulcibella, moored at the island of Norderney. There, they find Dollmann and von Brüning have beaten them and are seemingly suspicious. However, getting in the fog from Norderney to Memmert and back is a nearly impossible feat, which only Davies' superb seamanship could have achieved, and the Germans do not seriously suspect them of having done that.

Von Brüning invites them to Dollmann's villa for a dinner, where he attempts to subtly cross-examine them to find out if they are British spies. Carruthers plays a dangerous game, admitting they are curious. But he convinces von Brüning that he believes the cover story about treasure and merely wants to see the imaginary "wreck". The party also serves to show that the Germans do not fully trust the renegade Englishman Dollmann and that there is some rift between them which might be widened.

Carruthers announces that the Foreign Office has recalled him to England. He heads off, being accompanied part of the way to the Dutch border by one of the German conspirators – outwardly an affable fellow-traveller. But instead of embarking from Amsterdam to England, he doubles back, returns to Germany in time to be present at the conspirators' rendezvous (to which Dollmann, significantly, was not invited). He manages to follow von Brüning and his men without being noticed, and trails them to a port where they board a tugboat towing a barge. Carruthers then sneaks aboard and hides, and the convoy heads to sea.

Carruthers finally puts the riddle together. The Germans are linking the canals and the railways, dredging passages through the shifting sands and hiding a fleet of tugs and barges. The only explanation is that they are preparing to secretly transport a powerful German army across the North Sea to invade Britain's east coast. He escapes after grounding the tugboat and rushes back to Davies. He finds him and explains how they must flee before the Germans come after them. They convince Dollmann and Clara to come with them to avoid Dollmann's being arrested by the Germans, who will think he has changed sides again. They promise Dollman immunity from being charged for treason in Britain – which, acting on their own and not having any authorization from the British government, they were not truly in a position to promise. As they sail across the North Sea, Dollmann commits suicide by jumping overboard, presumably to avoid disgrace and probable arrest.

An epilogue by the "editor" examines the details of a report prepared by Dollmann, outlining his plan for the invasion force. A postscript notes that the Royal Navy is finally taking countermeasures to intercept any German invasion fleet and urges haste.

Literary criticism
Childers's biographer Andrew Boyle noted: "For the next ten years Childers's book remained the most powerful contribution of any English writer to the debate on Britain's alleged military unpreparedness." It was a notable influence on John Buchan, and on Ken Follett, who described it as "an open-air adventure thriller about two young men who stumble upon a German armada preparing to invade England." Follett has also called it "the first modern thriller".

Rhodri Jeffreys-Jones listed The Riddle of the Sands as one of the ten classic spy novels, in The Guardian'''s best spy novel list. Robert McCrum of The Observer included it in his list of the 100 greatest novels of all time.The Daily Telegraph has cited the book as the second best spy novel of all time, after Kipling's Kim.

Historical context
Though wars with Germany would become a central issue for Britain for much of the first half of the 20th century, few Britons anticipated that before 1900. Historically, it was France which was the traditional enemy of England and Britain, from the Hundred Years' War until the Napoleonic Wars. Just nine years before The Riddle of the Sands, William Le Queux published The Great War in England, raising the spectre of a French surprise invasion of England, reaching London – with Germany cast as Britain's loyal ally, rushing to help and in the nick of time saving England from the evil French; as evident from the great success of this book when published in 1894, the British public at that time took seriously the idea of a French threat and a German ally. But Emperor Wilhelm II's policy of building up the German Navy and challenging British sea power effected a change in the actual power relations – reflected in the specific literary genre of invasion novels and the identity assigned to the possible invader of British soil.

As described in its author's own words, Riddle of the Sands was written as "... a story with a purpose", written from "a patriot's natural sense of duty", which predicted war with Germany and called for British preparedness. The whole genre of "invasion novels" raised the public's awareness of the "potential threat" of Imperial Germany. Although the belief has grown that the book was responsible for the development of the naval base at Rosyth, the novel was published in May 1903, two months after the purchase of the land for the Rosyth naval base was announced in Parliament (5 March 1903) and some time after secret negotiations for the purchase had begun. Although Winston Churchill later credited the book as a major reason why the Admiralty had decided to establish the new naval bases, this seems unlikely. When war was declared he ordered the Director of Naval Intelligence to find Childers, whom he had met when the author was campaigning to represent a naval seat in Parliament, and employ him. At the time Childers was writing Riddle he was also contributing to a factual book published by The Times in which he warned of outdated British army tactics in the event of "conflicts of the future". He developed this theme in two further works he published in 1911: War and the Arme Blanche and German Influence on British Cavalry.

The novel contains many realistic details based on Childers' own sailing trips along the East Frisia coast, and large parts of his logbook entries from an 1897 Baltic cruise "appear almost unedited in the book." The yacht Dulcibella in the novel is based upon Vixen, the boat Childers used for his exploration. In August 1910, inspired by the work, two British amateur yachtsmen, Captain Bernard Trench RM and Lieutenant Vivian Brandon RN, undertook a sailing holiday along the same section of the Frisian coast, during which they collected information about German naval installations. The two men were sentenced to four years custody by a military court in Leipzig, but they were pardoned by the Emperor in 1913. They joined "Room 40", the intelligence and decoding section of the British Admiralty, on the outbreak of war.

It is noteworthy that the demonization and vilification of Kaiser Wilhelm, which would become a staple of British propaganda in later years, are conspicuously absent from The Riddle of the Sands. To the contrary, on several occasions the character Davies expresses admiration for the German Emperor: "He is a fine fellow, that emperor. [...] By Jove! We want a man like that Kaiser, who doesn't wait to be kicked, but works like a nigger for his country, and sees ahead".

Lower in the hierarchy, Carruthers several times states that he likes Commander von Brüning as a person – and this liking is not diminished by the discovery that von Brüning is deeply involved in the plan to invade England. In general, the book's protagonists feel no malice towards the Germans. Rather, they take a "sporting" attitude, frankly admiring the Germans' audacity and resourcefulness while being determined to outwit them and foil their plans.

The invasion plan

From the start it is obvious that something is going on behind the placid facade of the Frisian islands and towns. The protagonists gather hints, follow clues and form various hypotheses. There are many red herrings – for example, for much of the book, their suspicions centre on Memmert. However, though that island provides a convenient cover for the German plotters to meet and talk, what is actually going on there is a genuine salvage operation seeking a cargo of gold from a French ship sunk during the Napoleonic Wars. The actual German design, revealed only at the end – a full-fledged, meticulous plan for the invasion of England – is in fact unfolding among very mundane and prosaic small Frisian towns and harbours.

As set out in detail in the book's Epilogue, the German plan constitutes a vast, audacious military deception. While the British would observe the major German ports and the array of German battleships and detect no signs of an impending invasion, the invasion force would gather unnoticed in the Frisian countryside. German troops – infantry with the lightest type of field guns – would board big sea-going lighters, towed by powerful but shallow-draught tugs, which would proceed to the sea through the Frisian canal network that had unobtrusively been widened and extended for years, in preparation for this day. Seven invasion flotillas would emerge – not from any major port, but out of seven contemptible tiny Frisian harbours which are open only at high tide and then only to small vessels; harbours of whose existence the British Admiralty is barely aware, and which were certainly never viewed as having any kind of military value or posing any threat. From there, the invaders quickly dash over a distance of 240 sea miles and land completely unexpected and unopposed at The Wash on the eastern shore of England. With the beachhead secured, more German ships would follow with munitions and heavy artillery.

As the Epilogue points out, such an invasion would necessarily involve a German strategic gamble – since, after some initial confusion, the British Royal Navy could be expected to rally and regain its control of the North Sea. With that, the German invading force would be cut off from further supplies and would be dependent on what they could bring with them in the initial stage, plus whatever British resources they could capture. German success would depend on a swift exploitation of the element of surprise, breaking out of the initial landing area to quickly capture their main objective: "the industrial heart of the [British] kingdom, the great northern and midland towns, with their teeming populations of peaceful wage earners". The projected landing site at The Wash would place the Germans conveniently close to that industrial heartland. The plan does not include any direct attack on London (which would have necessitated a different and far more risky landing place). German hopes for a quick and decisive victory would hinge upon the loss of the industrial towns being so demoralizing to the British and dislocating to their economy that Britain would agree to sign a peace on terms favourable to Germany. Should the British prove persistent, obdurate and willing to engage in a long war (as they actually would in 1940) the German invading force, cut off from fresh supplies, might eventually end up in a dire situation.

Actually, the protagonists come upon the invasion plan in an advanced state of preparation; but still with a lot left to do before it could be implemented. One of the crucial factors for its success is to make sure that the lighters being built for troop transport would actually stand open sea conditions – unlike the ordinary lighters used in this area, which usually do not venture out of the protected waters behind the Frisian islands. The clue followed by Carruthers, in a brief overheard conversation of the German plotters, is that one such lighter would be tested under open sea conditions and that a certain high-ranking German "insisted on being personally present". The hidden Carruthers is present at the successful testing voyage when the lighter proves fully seaworthy, and then manages to sabotage the tug and escape. In the confusion Carruthers sees the face of the high-ranking participant and recognizes him as "one who, in Germany, has a better right to insist than anyone else" – the clear implication being that it was Kaiser Wilhelm II in person.

Film, television, and theatrical adaptationsThe Riddle of the Sands (1979) is a film adaptation of the book, starring Michael York as Charles Carruthers and Simon MacCorkindale as Arthur Davies.

A 90-minute BBC Radio 4 adaptation was broadcast in January 1994, as part of the Saturday Night Theatre strand, starring Laurence Kennedy as Carruthers and Charles Simpson as Davies. 

In Germany, the novel was popularised by the TV movie Das Rätsel der Sandbank (1984), produced by the public television and radio station Radio Bremen, and starring Burghart Klaußner as Davies and Peter Sattmann as Carruthers.

Sequel
In 1998, nautical writer Sam Llewellyn wrote a continuation of the story named The Shadow in the Sands. This is subtitled "being an account of the cruise of the yacht Gloria in the Frisian Islands in April 1903 and the Conclusion of the Events described by Erskine Childers."

Llewellyn assumes that the British authorities disregarded the warnings brought by the protagonists of Childers's book and the preparations for a German invasion of England continued unabated. The Duke of Leominster – a cynical schemer but also a British patriot – takes on his own the act of sending the Gloria'' for a desperate last moment effort. On board are the narrator Charlie Webb, a lowly fisherman but highly capable and resourceful, together with his mate Sam and the sinister Captain Dacre, a military officer cashiered for wantonly killing a Boer woman in South Africa. They tangle with the arrogant and cruel Baron von Tritt, and Charlie Webb wins the love of the beautiful Gräfin von und zu Marsdorff (Katya to those intimate with her). A series of daring acts of sabotage and arson by the protagonists, undertaken with the risk of being hanged out of hand if caught, succeeds against all odds in derailing Kaiser Wilhelm's carefully prepared invasion plan, and a quarter of a million German soldiers who were poised to board the invasion fleet return to barracks. The German and British governments tacitly agree to pretend none of this ever happened, though the countdown continues towards the bloodletting of 1914. Meanwhile, the resourceful Webb reaps his just rewards, marries happily his Gräfin and is headed for a future as a shipping magnate with a seat in the House of Lords.

See also
Imperial German plans for the invasion of the United Kingdom
Invasion literature

References
Notes

Bibliography

External links 
 
 
 
 

Invasion literature
British spy novels
British adventure novels
1903 British novels
British novels adapted into films
Fictional invasions of England
The
Public domain books
Cultural depictions of Wilhelm II
Smith, Elder & Co books